Coats House is a historic home located at Tarboro, Edgecombe County, North Carolina. It was built about 1860, and is a two-story, three bays wide, English Cottage style brick dwelling.  It features a hipped roof with wide, overhanging eaves and a cupola and four interior end chimneys.  Also on the property are the contributing brick kitchen and a frame smokehouse. Its builder, Thomas H. Coats, also built the Calvary Episcopal Church and First Baptist Church in Raleigh, North Carolina.

It was listed on the National Register of Historic Places in 1973. It is located in the Tarboro Historic District.

References

Houses on the National Register of Historic Places in North Carolina
Houses completed in 1860
Houses in Edgecombe County, North Carolina
National Register of Historic Places in Edgecombe County, North Carolina
Individually listed contributing properties to historic districts on the National Register in North Carolina
1860 establishments in North Carolina